Gresham County is one of the 141 Cadastral divisions of New South Wales.

Gresham County was named in honour of the London merchant, Sir Thomas Gresham (1519–1579). It is located to the south of parts of the Mann River, Nymboida River and Clarence River. It includes parts of the Guy Fawkes River National Park.

Parishes within this county
A full list of parishes found within this county; their current LGA and mapping coordinates to the approximate centre of each location is as follows:

References

Counties of New South Wales